Northport Public Library is a historic library building located at Northport in Suffolk County, New York.  It was designed and built in 1914, with funds provided by the philanthropist Andrew Carnegie.   It is one of 3,000 such libraries constructed between 1885 and 1919, and one of 107 in New York State. Carnegie provided $10,000 toward the construction of the Northport library.  It is a small masonry structure in the Jacobethan Revival style.  It consists of a primary gable front section housing the stacks and reading room, and a secondary side gable wing containing the entrance vestibule and staircase. It features a slate roof and barrel vaulted reading room. It was expanded in 1958.

The building functioned as a library until 1967; in 1974 it became home to the Northport Historical Society Museum. It was added to the National Register of Historic Places in 1996.

References

External links

Northport Historical Society website
Image from the Long Island North Shore Heritage Area Website

Library buildings completed in 1914
Libraries on the National Register of Historic Places in New York (state)
Carnegie libraries in New York (state)
History museums in New York (state)
Historical society museums in New York (state)
Museums in Suffolk County, New York
Northport, New York
National Register of Historic Places in Huntington (town), New York